Anna Zahorska de domo Elzenberg (1882 in Byszlaki – 1942 in Auschwitz concentration camp), pseudonym Savitri, was a Polish poet, prosaist, dramatist. Graduate of Polish philology at the Jagiellonian University and Russian philology at the University of Warsaw. Activist of Polish Socialist Party. In the interwar period related with Catholic movement.

Zahorska was an author of lyric poetry, patriotic and social-revolutionary poems Pieśni walki (1908), Poezje (1908), Dniom zmartwychwstania (1914), novels Utopia, Trucizny (1928), dramas Pani słoneczna (1912), Bezrobocie (1927), collection of stories Księga milczenia (1927), hagiographic works.

References

1882 births
1942 deaths
19th-century Polish novelists
19th-century Polish women writers
19th-century Polish writers
20th-century Polish poets
20th-century Polish women writers
20th-century Polish writers
Jagiellonian University alumni
Polish children's writers
Polish people who died in Auschwitz concentration camp
Polish women novelists
Polish women poets
University of Warsaw alumni
Polish women children's writers